In statistics, the folded-t and half-t distributions are derived from Student's t-distribution by taking the absolute values of variates. This is analogous to the folded-normal and the half-normal statistical distributions being derived from the normal distribution.

Definitions
The folded non-standardized t distribution is the distribution of the absolute value of the non-standardized t distribution with  degrees of freedom; its probability density function is given by:
.

If , the folded-t distribution reduces to the special case of the half-t distribution. Its probability density function then simplifies to
.
The half-t distribution's first two moments (expectation and variance) are given by:
,
and
.

Relation to other distributions
Folded-t and half-t generalize the folded normal and half-normal distributions by allowing for finite degrees-of-freedom (the normal analogues constitute the limiting cases of infinite degrees-of-freedom).

See also

 Folded normal distribution
 Half-normal distribution
 Modified half-normal distribution
 Half-logistic distribution

References

Further reading

External links
 Functions to evaluate half-t distributions are available in several R packages, e.g.   .

Continuous distributions